Paraíso is a canton in the Cartago province of Costa Rica. The head city is in Paraíso district.

History 
Paraíso was created on 7 December 1848 by decree 167.

Geography 
Paraíso has an area of  km² and a mean elevation of  metres.

Paraíso is an elongated canton that stretches southeast from its headi city to encompass a swatch of the Cordillera de Talamanca (Talamanca Mountain Range).

Districts 
The canton of Paraíso is subdivided into the following districts:
 Paraíso
 Santiago
 Orosi
 Cachí
 Llanos de Santa Lucía
 Birrisito

Demographics 

For the 2011 census, Paraíso had a population of  inhabitants.

Transportation

Road transportation 
The canton is covered by the following road routes:

Rail transportation 
The Interurbano Line operated by Incofer goes through this canton.

References 

Cantons of Cartago Province
Populated places in Cartago Province